Fu Lian Cheng, initially known as Xi Lian Cheng, was a Peking Opera school established in 1904 in Beijing, the capital of the Qing dynasty. It closed in 1948, during the Chinese Civil War. It was the Peking opera school with the longest history, the largest scale, and the greatest number of graduates.

Fu Lian Cheng was sponsored by the Jilin merchant Niu Zihou, and run by the Peking opera performer Ye Chunshan. In forty-four years, it trained seven classes of almost 700 students, including some of the greatest Peking opera artists, like Mei Lanfang, Zhou Xinfang, Ma Lianliang, Xiao Cuihua (Yu Lianquan), Tan Fuying, Ma Fulu, and Ye Shengzhang.

In popular culture
In 1995, the story of Fu Lian Cheng was dramatized as a 28-episode television series titled Niu Zihou and Fu Lian Cheng.

In 2014, Niu Zihou's story was made into a television film titled Godfather of Peking Opera.

References

1902 establishments in China
1948 disestablishments in China
Peking opera
Schools of Chinese opera